The prime minister of Malta is the head of government, which is the highest official of Malta. The Prime Minister chairs Cabinet meetings, and selects its ministers to serve in their respective portfolios. The Prime Minister holds office by virtue of their ability to command the confidence of the Parliament, as such they sit as Member of Parliament.

The Prime Minister is appointed by the President, in doing so, the President is of the opinion that the appointed individual is the most able to command the majority of the House of Representatives; typically, this individual is the leader of a political party or coalition of parties that hold the largest number of seats in the House of Representatives. 

Fourteen people have served as prime minister of Malta since the office was established in 1921. The post did not exist in the period between 1933 and 1947 and also in the period between 1958 and 1962. Joseph Howard was the inaugural holder of the role, while Robert Abela is the incumbent. As of 2022, there have been 5 Nationalist Party prime ministers, 6 Labour Party prime ministers, 2 Political Union-affiliated prime ministers, 1 Constitutionalist prime minister and one Workers Party-affiliated prime minister.

List of officeholders
Political parties

Timeline

See also
 Prime Minister of Malta
 President of Malta 
 Government of Malta
 House of Representatives of Malta

References

Malta, List of Prime Ministers of
Prime Ministers